Gerard Aloysius "Gerry" Coyne (born 9 August 1948) is an English former footballer who played in the Football League as a centre forward for York City and in the Scottish Football League for Berwick Rangers. He also played non-league football for South Shields, Gateshead and Scarborough.

He signed for Limerick F.C. for the 1972-73 League of Ireland season but after a few months he moved to Cork Hibernians in November 1972. The season ended with Hibs winning the FAI Cup after a replay which secured European football in the 1973–74 European Cup Winners' Cup where they played FC Baník Ostrava. Coyne played in the home leg at Flower Lodge appearing as a substitute.

Honours
FAI Cup: 
 Cork Hibernians – 1973
League of Ireland Shield
 Cork Hibernians – 1973
Dublin City Cup: 
 Cork Hibernians – 1973
Munster Senior Cup
 Cork Hibernians – 1973

References

1948 births
Living people
People from Hebburn
Footballers from Tyne and Wear
English footballers
Association football forwards
York City F.C. players
South Shields F.C. (1936) players
Gateshead F.C. players
Scarborough F.C. players
Berwick Rangers F.C. players
English Football League players
Northern Premier League players
Scottish Football League players
Limerick F.C. players
Cork Hibernians F.C. players
League of Ireland players
Expatriate association footballers in the Republic of Ireland
English expatriate footballers